Teddy Christopher Graham Jenks (born 12 March 2002) is an English footballer who plays as a midfielder for EFL League Two club Crawley Town, on loan from Brighton & Hove Albion of the Premier League.

Club career

Brighton & Hove Albion
Jenks made his professional debut for Brighton & Hove Albion, on 25 September 2019 starting in a 3–1 defeat at home against Aston Villa in the EFL Cup despite playing well. He came on as a substitute in the 2–0 away win over Preston in the EFL Cup on 23 September 2020, Jenks' first appearance in almost a year for the senior side.

Aberdeen (loan)

On 14 June 2021, it was announced that Jenks would join Scottish Premiership club Aberdeen on loan for the 2021–22 season. He made his debut on 22 July, coming on as a 90+6 minute substitute for fellow debutant Christian Ramirez in a 5–1 home victory over BK Häcken in the new UEFA Europa Conference League.
A week later he came on for Jay Emmanuel-Thomas in the 50th minute in the second leg away at Häcken where The Dons lost 2–0, however they progressed into the Europa Conference main draw after winning 5–3 on aggregate. On 8 August, he made his first league appearance of his career starting in the Scottish Premiership away fixture at Livingston and scoring the equaliser in the eventual 2–1 victory. Jenks was sent off on his eighth Aberdeen appearance after being shown a second yellow card in an eventual 3–2 away loss against St Mirren on 26 September. He scored his second goal for The Dons on 11 December, striking late to score the winner and only goal of the game in the 1–0 away victory over St Johnstone.

Crawley Town (loan) 
On 29 July 2022, Jenks joined EFL League Two club Crawley Town on a season-long loan.

International career
Jenks was a member of the England under-17 squad at the 2019 UEFA European Under-17 Championship and scored against Sweden as they were eliminated at the group stage.

Personal life
Jenks' younger brother, Eliot, plays for Brighton U18s, becoming a first-year professional for the 2021–22 season.

Career statistics

External links

References

2002 births
Living people
English footballers
Association football midfielders
Brighton & Hove Albion F.C. players
Aberdeen F.C. players
Crawley Town F.C. players
England youth international footballers
Scottish Professional Football League players
Footballers from Brighton